Lycaena cuprea, the lustrous copper, is a butterfly of the family Lycaenidae. It is found in the western mountains of North America.

The wingspan is 23–30 mm. Adults are on wing from mid-June to July or August. They feed on the nectar of Cirsium, Medicago sativa and Melilotus species.

The larvae feed on Oxyria digyna and Rumex species.

Subspecies
L. c. snowi (Edwards, 1881)
L. c. henryae (Cadbury, 1937)

References

Lycaena
Butterflies described in 1870